The second season of Serbian talent show Ja imam talenat!, which was shot during the second half of 2010. Hosted by Vladimir Aleksić and Ivana Bajić, and judged by Ivan Tasovac, Danica Maksimović and Aleksandar Milić Mili. This was the first season that was broadcast on the Public Broadcasting Service of Serbia, RTS. The first episode was aired on 17 April 2011.

Auditions
The producer auditions were held in the first part of 2011, in 4 cities: Belgrade, Novi Sad, Niš and Kragujevac. The number of acts that applied was higher than the previous year (over 4000). The auditions in front of the judges were held in late August and during the first days of September 2010, and all took place in Belgrade.
The variety of talents and acts is a lot bigger than the first season. Although most of the acts are singers and dancers, there was a fakir, some contortionist, comedians and other variety acts.

Semi-finals
Top 40 acts that made the semi-finals were revealed on 5 June 2011.
Unlike the previous year, live shows are aired from Studio 8 - studio in suburban neighbourhood of Košutnjak, where most of the shows that are broadcast on RTS are recorded. Stage and the set are also different, less similar to staging of the British version of the show.
Two semifinals are aired per weekend, with 8 semi-finalists performing per show. After all the semi-finalists perform, lines are opened for 15 minutes, after which the votes are counted.

Semi-finalists

Semi-final 1

Guest performer: Nina Radojičić - Čaroban

Semi-final 2

Guest performers: Miki Perić i Aleksandar Čolić - Da te ne volim

Semi-final 3

Semi-final 4

Semi-final 5

Final

References

Ja imam talenat!
2011 Serbian television seasons